Peter Sillence Fleming (November 23, 1928 – January 8, 1956) was a Christian who was one of five missionaries killed while participating in Operation Auca, an attempt to evangelize the Huaorani people of Ecuador.

Early life
Fleming was born in Seattle, Washington. At Queen Anne High School, Fleming earned letters in basketball and golf and graduated as valedictorian of his class. He also won a citywide oratorical contest. 

In 1946, Fleming entered the University of Washington as a philosophy major. He was very driven in college, working part-time and dedicating much time to prayer and Bible study, as well as keeping up on his classes. He was also elected president of the UCA at his college, and received a master's degree from there in 1951.

Fleming met Jim Elliot during many conferences and mountain climbing expeditions arranged by a large Christian organization. They were good friends and once spent six weeks preaching together across the country. Elliot had a great deal of influence on Fleming and was largely responsible for his becoming a missionary and for his decision to (temporarily) break off his engagement to Olive Ainslie, a childhood friend.

References
 
 
 

1928 births
1956 deaths
20th-century Protestant martyrs
American people murdered abroad
American Plymouth Brethren
American Protestant missionaries
American evangelicals
Operation Auca
People from Seattle
People murdered in Ecuador
Protestant missionaries in Ecuador
Victims of anti-Christian violence
1956 murders in Ecuador
American expatriates in Ecuador